Mount Frazier is the northernmost peak of the Rockefeller Mountains, standing  north of Mount Jackling on Edward VII Peninsula in Marie Byrd Land, Antarctica. It was discovered on January 27, 1929, by the Byrd Antarctic Expedition. It was named for Russell G. Frazier, medical officer at the West Base of the United States Antarctic Service (1939–41), and observer with the Rockefeller Mountains Geological Party, which visited this area in December 1940.

References

Mountains of King Edward VII Land